The 2015 African Games women's football tournament was the 4th edition of the African Games women's football tournament. The women's football tournament was held in Brazzaville, the Republic of the Congo between 6–18 September 2015 as part of the 2015 African Games. The tournament was open to full women's national teams (unlike the men's tournament, which was age-restricted).

Qualification

Congo qualified automatically as hosts, while the remaining seven spots were determined by the qualifying rounds, which were organized by the Confederation of African Football (CAF) and took place from February to April 2015.

Qualified teams
The following eight teams qualified for the final tournament.

On 26 August 2015, the CAF announced that Egypt had withdrawn from the competition. Senegal, the team eliminated by Egypt in the final round, declined to replace them due to short notice. Therefore, only seven teams competed in the tournament, and Group B, where Egypt were drawn in, was composed of three teams only.

Venues
A new 60,000 capacity stadium, Stade Municipal de Kintélé, was built for the 2015 African Games. The Stade Alphonse Massemba-Débat and Stade Kintélé 3 were also used.

Squads

Group stage
The draw was held on 9 July 2015, 11:00 UTC+2, at the CAF Headquarters in Cairo, Egypt. The eight teams were drawn into two groups of four. For the draw, the hosts Congo were seeded in position A1 and the holders Cameroon were seeded in position B1. The remaining six teams were drawn from one pot to fill the other positions in the two groups.

The top two teams of each group advanced to the semi-finals.

All times were local, WAT (UTC+1).

Group A

Group B

Knockout stage

Bracket

Semi-finals

Bronze medal match

Gold medal match

Final ranking

Goalscorers
5 goals
 Desire Oparanozie

2 goals
 Esther Sunday

1 goal

 Ninon Abena
 Henriette Akaba
 Christine Manie
 Madeleine Ngono Mani
 Flore Mabahou-Ngoma
 Dedina Mbondzo
 Hillia Kobblah
 Portia Boakye
 Samira Suleman
 Rita Akaffou
 Fatou Coulibaly
 Rebecca Elloh
 Josée Nahi
 Ange N'Guessan
 Sandrine Niamien
 Mercy Amanze
 Onome Ebi
 Chinwendu Ihezuo
 Chinaza Uchendu
 Leandra Smeda
 Shelder Mafuru

See also
Football at the 2015 African Games – Men's tournament

References

External links
Official Website of the African Games, Brazzaville 2015
African Games Women Brazzaville 2015, CAFonline.com

Women's